"Smalltown Boy" is a song by British synth-pop band Bronski Beat, released in May 1984 as the first single from their debut album, The Age of Consent (1984). The song was a big commercial success, reaching number three in the band's native UK. It was also a number one hit in the Netherlands and Belgium, and hit the top 10 in Australia, Canada, France, Ireland, Italy, Switzerland and West Germany. The track reached number 48 in the US pop chart and was a number one US dance hit. A remix by Stephen Hague was released as a single on 24 December 1990. The song was released again in December 2013 after featuring in a Christmas advertising campaign for Boots UK. "Smalltown Boy" was also re-recorded by Jimmy Somerville and released as "Smalltown Boy Reprise" (2014) for the 30th anniversary of its initial release.

Music video
An official music video made by Bernard Rose was shot and released later in 1984. The narrative video features band member Jimmy Somerville as the boy who has experienced the issues described in the lyrics. Seen on a train, he is contemplating his childhood through flashbacks and the events that have caused him to leave his parents' home.

At a swimming pool, the boy and his friends (played by band members Larry Steinbachek and Steve Bronski) admire another boy in Speedos on the diving board. Seeing them watch, he smiles back. Encouraged, the boy is dared by his friends to approach him, but this results in public rejection. The boy is later attacked in an alley by a homophobic gang, led by the young man he had approached at the swimming pool. A police officer takes him back to his home. It is implied that the boy's parents learn of his sexuality for the first time through this incident and are shocked, but only the father seems unsupportive. The boy is then shown hugging his mother goodbye and getting some travel money from the father. The boy reaches his hand out to shake his father's but his father does not return it. After, the boy catches a train to London, on which he is reunited with his friends.

Impact and legacy
Time Out ranked "Smalltown Boy" number 12 in their list of The 50 Best Gay Songs to Celebrate Pride All Year Long in 2022. They added,

Same year, Rolling Stone ranked it number 163 in their list of 200 Greatest Dance Songs of All Time.

Track listings and formats

 7" single BITE 1
"Smalltown Boy" – 3:58
"Memories" – 2:55

 7" single 820 091-7
"Smalltown Boy" – 3:58
"Memories" – 3:00

 12" single BITEX 1 / 820 996-1 / 9-29 017 / LDSPX 215
"Smalltown Boy" – 9:00
"Infatuation/Memories" – 7:38

 12" single MCA-23521
"Smalltown Boy" – 9:00
"Infatuation/Memories" – 7:42

Charts and certifications

Weekly charts

Year-end charts

Sales and certifications

Sampling and interpolations
In 1993, German band Real McCoy sampled the riff from "Smalltown Boy" in their song "Automatic Lover (Call for Love)".
In 2006, Swedish DJs Steve Angello and Axwell under the alias Supermode produced "Tell Me Why" using samples from the song.
In 2006, Daft Punk sampled the riff during a section of their Alive 2006/2007 tour during the song Too Long/Steam Machine.
In 2012, German industrial metal band Oomph! paid homage to "Smalltown Boy" in their song "Kleinstadtboy".
In 2015, Brandon Flowers sampled the riff from "Smalltown Boy" in his song "I Can Change".

Cover versions
In 2002, British gothic metal band Paradise Lost released a cover of the song on the limited edition of the album Symbol of Life.
In 2013, Austrian AOR band Cornerstone covered "Smalltown Boy" as a charity single for the "Room to Breathe" campaign to support cystic fibrosis research at Nottingham City Hospital. Their version reached number 50 on the Austria Top 75 on 20 December 2013.
In 2015, Belgian singer Kate Ryan covered the song retitled as "Runaway (Smalltown Boy)". It reached No. 23 on the Belgian (Flanders) chart.
Also in 2015, UK band Heavyball covered the song, firstly as a YouTube video in April 2015, and then as a track on the band's first album Black Eye Diaries in October 2015.
In 2020, South African country singer Orville Peck covered the song for the 2020 Pride edition of the Spotify Singles series.
In 2021, Kele released a cover of the song as the first single from his album The Waves Pt. 1.

See also
List of Dutch Top 40 number-one singles of 1984
List of number-one dance singles of 1985 (U.S.)

References

External links

1984 songs
1984 debut singles
1991 singles
Bronski Beat songs
Dutch Top 40 number-one singles
LGBT-related songs
London Records singles
Ultratop 50 Singles (Flanders) number-one singles
Songs written by Jimmy Somerville
Song recordings produced by Mike Thorne